

33001–33100 

|-id=002
| 33002 Everest || 1997 DM || Mount Everest (also known as Sagarmāthā in Nepal and Chomolungma in China) is the world's highest mountain. The summit is 8848 m above sea level. || 
|-id=004
| 33004 Dianesipiera || 1997 EP || Diane M. Sipiera (born 1955), American executive director of the Planetary Studies Foundation, author, and operator of the Star-Lab Planetarium || 
|-id=010
| 33010 Enricoprosperi ||  || Enrico Prosperi (born 1954), Italian astronomer and a discoverer of minor planets. Owner of the Castelmartini Observatory  in Tuscany, he has undertaken observing programs on many kinds of astronomical objects, including comets and minor planets since 1998. Prosperi is a member of the Italian astronomical associations UAI and SAIt. || 
|-id=011
| 33011 Kurtiscarsch ||  || Kurtis Mickel Carsch (born 1994) is a finalist in the 2012 Intel Science Talent Search, a science competition for high-school seniors, for his chemistry project. || 
|-id=012
| 33012 Eddieirizarry ||  || Eddie Irizarry (born 1969), an astronomer at the Sociedad de Astronomia del Caribe. || 
|-id=014
| 33014 Kalinich ||  || Adam Orval Kalinich (born 1994) is a finalist in the 2012 Intel Science Talent Search, a science competition for high-school seniors, for his mathematics project. || 
|-id=017
| 33017 Wronski ||  || Józef Maria Hoëne-Wron'ski (1778–1853), Polish mathematician and philosopher || 
|-id=027
| 33027 Brouillac || 1997 QE || Laurent Brouillac (born 1967), a member of the Association des Utilisateurs de Détecteurs Electroniques (AUDE), has contributed to the promotion of astronomical observations using Webcams. || 
|-id=034
| 33034 Dianadamrau ||  || Diana Damrau (born 1971) is a German soprano, who is a Kammersängerin of the Bavarian State Opera. She has a very broad repertoire, but is the epitomic Queen of the night in Mozart's The Magic Flute. || 
|-id=035
| 33035 Pareschi ||  || Giovanni Pareschi (born 1966), Italian astronomer || 
|-id=040
| 33040 Pavelmayer ||  || Pavel Mayer (born 1932), Czech astronomer at the Charles University in Prague || 
|-id=044
| 33044 Erikdavy || 1997 UE || Erik Davy Rees (born 2003), grandson of the discoverer Paul G. Comba || 
|-id=056
| 33056 Ogunimachi ||  || Ogunimachi, Niigata prefecture, Japan, famous for its washi (Japanese paper) production || 
|-id=058
| 33058 Kovařík ||  || Oton Kovařík (1928–2010), Czech actor, orator and painter, is now living in California with his wife Dása, also an actress. The Kovaříks have propagated European culture and helped to maintain European cultural traditions among immigrants in California, by public recitals of poems and by art exhibitions Src. || 
|-id=061
| 33061 Václavmorava ||  || Václav Morava (1933–2005) was a psychiatrist who specialized in treating children, youths and families in southern Bohemia. He was also known as a painter, graphic artist, sculptor, musician, essayist and poet. He was good, wise, helpful and never-to-be-forgotten friend. || 
|-id=100
| 33100 Udine ||  || Udine, chief town of the Friuli district in northeast Italy. Founded by Celtic tribes and later occupied by the Romans, it grew to great influence under the Patriarchate of Aquileia in the Middle Ages. Nowadays it is renowned for its castle and excellent wines. The citation was prepared by G. Sostero. || 
|}

33101–33200 

|-id=103
| 33103 Pintar ||  || James Anthony Pintarr (born 1947), American physicist and helioseismologist || 
|-id=113
| 33113 Julabeth ||  || Jula Elizabeth Rees, granddaughter of the discoverer || 
|-id=117
| 33117 Ashinimodi ||  || Ashini A. Modi (born 2004), a finalist in the 2016 Broadcom MASTERS, a math and science competition for middle school students, for her physics project. || 
|-id=118
| 33118 Naiknaware ||  || Anushka Naiknaware (born 2003), a finalist in the 2016 Broadcom MASTERS, a math and science competition for middle school students, for her materials & bioengineering project. || 
|-id=129
| 33129 Ivankrasko || 1998 CB || Ivan Krasko (né Ján Botto, 1876–1958) was a symbolist poet, founder of Slovak modernist literature, prosaist and translator from Romanian and German || 
|-id=135
| 33135 Davidrisoldi || 1998 DX || David Risoldi (born 2012), the second grandson of one of the discoverers at Santa Lucia observatory. || 
|-id=137
| 33137 Strejček ||  || Alfred Strejček (born 1941), a Czech actor, moderator, musician, screenwriter, narrator, reciter and professor of artistic rhetoric. || 
|-id=154
| 33154 Talent ||  || David L. Talent, American contractor team leader for the NEAT camera transition to the 1.2-m AMOS telescope on Haleakala || 
|-id=157
| 33157 Pertile ||  || Tomáš Pertile (born 1933), a Czech amateur astronomer at the Johann Palisa Observatory and the  Ostrava–Poruba Planetarium || 
|-id=158
| 33158 Rúfus ||  || Milan Rúfus, Slvak poet, essayist and translator || 
|-id=160
| 33160 Denismukwege ||  || Denis Mukwege (born 1950), a Congolese gynecologist and director of the Panzi Hospital in Bukavu which he founded in 1999. || 
|-id=162
| 33162 Sofiarandich ||  || Sofia Randich (born 1962), Italian astrophysicist and director of the Arcetri Observatory of the National Institute for Astrophysics since 2018. Her research includes star formation, stellar structure and spectroscopy, formation and evolution of the Milky Way. She is a member of the Gaia science team and the co-lead of the "Gaia–ESO Spectroscopic Survey", using the Very Large Telescope at Cerro Paranal in Chile (Src). || 
|-id=163
| 33163 Alainaspect || 1998 EH || Alain Aspect (born 1947) is a French physicist who performed the first conclusive test of the Einstein-Podolsky-Rosen paradox. He is a member of the French Académie des sciences , a laureate of the Holweck prize (1991), a gold medalist of the CNRS (1995), an Albert Einstein medalist (2012) and a Niels Bohr medalist (2013). || 
|-id=165
| 33165 Joschhambsch ||  || Franz-Josef (Josch) Hambsch (born 1957) is a retired nuclear physicist, who worked for the Joint Research Centre in Geel, Belgium from 1984 to 2018. An active variable star observer, he has participated in many scientific research projects. Hambsch discovered the first white-dwarf pulsar AR Sco. || 
|-id=175
| 33175 Isabellegleeson ||  || Isabelle Jane Pravdova Gleeson (born 2019), granddaughter of Slovak astronomer Alexander Pravda, who co-discovered this minor planet. Isabelle and her parents live in Ireland. || 
|-id=179
| 33179 Arsènewenger ||  || Arsène Wenger, French manager, former manager of the English football team Arsenal Football Club || 
|-id=181
| 33181 Aalokpatwa ||  || Aalok Nital Patwa (born 2002), a finalist in the 2016 Broadcom MASTERS, a math and science competition for middle school students, for his materials & bioengineering project. || 
|-id=187
| 33187 Pizzolato ||  || Rachel Michelle Pizzolato (born 2004), a finalist in the 2016 Broadcom MASTERS, a math and science competition for middle school students, for her energy and sustainability project. || 
|-id=188
| 33188 Shreya ||  || Shreya Ramachandran (born 2003), a finalist in the 2016 Broadcom MASTERS, a math and science competition for middle school students, for her environmental and earth sciences project. || 
|-id=189
| 33189 Ritzdorf ||  || Lucas Lee Ritzdorf (born 2002) is a finalist in the 2016 Broadcom MASTERS, a math and science competition for middle school students, for his environmental and earth sciences project. || 
|-id=190
| 33190 Sigrest ||  || Eleanor Wren Sigrest (born 2003), a finalist in the 2016 Broadcom MASTERS, a math and science competition for middle school students, for her electrical and mechanical engineering project. || 
|-id=191
| 33191 Santiagostone ||  || Santiago Stone (born 2001), a finalist in the 2016 Broadcom MASTERS, a math and science competition for middle school students, for his materials & bioengineering project. || 
|-id=193
| 33193 Emhyr ||  || Emhyr Subramanian (born 2002), a finalist in the 2016 Broadcom MASTERS, a math and science competition for middle school students, for his chemistry project. || 
|-id=195
| 33195 Davenyadav ||  || Daven Raymond Yadav (born 2002), a finalist in the 2016 Broadcom MASTERS, a math and science competition for middle school students, for his materials & bioengineering project. || 
|-id=196
| 33196 Kaienyang ||  || Kaien Yang (born 2002), a finalist in the 2016 Broadcom MASTERS, a math and science competition for middle school students, for his medicine and health sciences project. || 
|-id=197
| 33197 Charlallen ||  || Charla Allen, a mentor of finalist in the 2016 Broadcom MASTERS, a math and science competition for middle school students. || 
|-id=198
| 33198 Mackewicz ||  || Heather Mackewicz, a mentor of finalist in the 2016 Broadcom MASTERS, a math and science competition for middle school students. || 
|-id=200
| 33200 Carasummit ||  || Cara Summit mentored a finalist in the 2016 Broadcom MASTERS, a math and science competition for middle school students. She teaches at the Canterbury School, Fort Myers, Florida. || 
|}

33201–33300 

|-
| 33201 Thomasartiss ||  || Thomas Artiss mentored a finalist in the 2016 Broadcom MASTERS, a math and science competition for middle school students. He teaches at the Harker School, San Jose, California. || 
|-id=202
| 33202 Davignon ||  || Aimee Davignon mentored a finalist in the 2016 Broadcom MASTERS, a math and science competition for middle school students. She teaches at the Henry E. Huntington Middle School, San Marino, California. || 
|-id=205
| 33205 Graigmarx ||  || Graig Marx mentored a finalist in the 2016 Broadcom MASTERS, a math and science competition for middle school students. He teaches at the Winchester Thurston School, Pittsburgh, Pennsylvania. || 
|-id=210
| 33210 Johnrobertson ||  || John Robertson mentored a finalist in the 2016 Broadcom MASTERS, a math and science competition for middle school students. He teaches at the Alcott Elementary School, Riverside, California. || 
|-id=213
| 33213 Diggs ||  || Katherine Diggs mentored a finalist in the 2016 Broadcom MASTERS, a math and science competition for middle school students. She teaches at the St. Joseph School Fullerton, Baltimore, Maryland. || 
|-id=215
| 33215 Garyjones ||  || Gary Jones mentored a finalist in the 2016 Broadcom MASTERS, a math and science competition for middle school students. He teaches at the Westminster Schools, Atlanta, Georgia. || 
|-id=217
| 33217 Bonnybasu ||  || Bonny Basu mentored a finalist in the 2016 Broadcom MASTERS, a math and science competition for middle school students. She teaches at the Challenger School, Shawnee, San Jose, California. || 
|-id=219
| 33219 De Los Santos ||  || Tomas De Los Santos mentored a finalist in the 2016 Broadcom MASTERS, a math and science competition for middle school students. He teaches at the Santa Gertrudis School, Kingsville, Texas. || 
|-id=221
| 33221 Raqueljacobson ||  || Raquel Jacobson-Peregrino mentored a finalist in the 2016 Broadcom MASTERS, a math and science competition for middle school students. She teaches at the Boston Latin School, Boston, Massachusetts. || 
|-id=222
| 33222 Gillingham ||  || David Gillingham mentored a finalist in the 2016 Broadcom MASTERS, a math and science competition for middle school students. He teaches at the High Tech Middle, San Diego, California. || 
|-id=224
| 33224 Lesrogers ||  || Les Rogers mentored a finalist in the 2016 Broadcom MASTERS, a math and science competition for middle school students. He teaches at the Saint Edward's School, Vero Beach, Florida. || 
|-id=226
| 33226 Melissamacko ||  || Melissa Macko mentored a finalist in the 2016 Broadcom MASTERS, a math and science competition for middle school students. She teaches at the Aventura Waterways K-8 Center, Miami, Florida. || 
|-id=230
| 33230 Libbyrobertson ||  || Libby Robertson mentored a finalist in the 2016 Broadcom MASTERS, a math and science competition for middle school students. She teaches at the Franklin Fine Arts Center, Chicago, Illinois. || 
|-id=247
| 33247 Iannacone ||  || Kelli Iannacone mentored a finalist in the 2016 Broadcom MASTERS, a math and science competition for middle school students. She teaches at the Timberlane Middle School, Pennington, New Jersey. || 
|-id=248
| 33248 Nataliehowell ||  || Natalie Howell mentored a finalist in the 2016 Broadcom MASTERS, a math and science competition for middle school students. She teaches at the Caddo Middle Magnet, Shreveport, Louisiana. || 
|-id=249
| 33249 Pamelasvenson ||  || Pamela Svenson mentored a finalist in the 2016 Broadcom MASTERS, a math and science competition for middle school students. She teaches at the Stoller Middle School, Portland, Oregon. || 
|-id=254
| 33254 Sundaresakumar ||  || Preethi Sundaresakumar mentored a finalist in the 2016 Broadcom MASTERS, a math and science competition for middle school students. She teaches at the Stratford Middle School, San Jose, California. || 
|-id=255
| 33255 Kathybush ||  || Kathy Bush mentored a finalist in the 2016 Broadcom MASTERS, a math and science competition for middle school students. She teaches at the John Curtis Christian School, River Ridge, Louisiana. || 
|-id=258
| 33258 Femariebustos ||  || Fe Marie Bustos mentored a finalist in the 2016 Broadcom MASTERS, a math and science competition for middle school students. She teaches at the Stratford Middle School, Fremont, California. || 
|-id=261
| 33261 Ginagarlie ||  || Gina Garlie mentored a finalist in the 2016 Broadcom MASTERS, a math and science competition for middle school students. She teaches at the Kalispell Middle School, Kalispell, Montana. || 
|-id=263
| 33263 Willhutch ||  || William Hutchinson mentored a finalist in the 2016 Broadcom MASTERS, a math and science competition for middle school students. He teaches at the Louise A. Benton Middle School, Manassas, Virginia. || 
|-id=264
| 33264 Maryrogers ||  || Mary Rogers mentored a finalist in the 2016 Broadcom MASTERS, a math and science competition for middle school students. She teaches at St. John the Evangelist, Severna Park, Maryland. || 
|-id=269
| 33269 Broccoli ||  || JoMarie Broccoli mentored a finalist in the 2016 Broadcom MASTERS, a math and science competition for middle school students. She teaches at the Nysmith School for the Gifted and Talented, Herndon, Virginia. || 
|-id=270
| 33270 Katiecrysup ||  || Kathrine Crysup-Sikes mentored a finalist in the 2016 Broadcom MASTERS, a math and science competition for middle school students. She teaches at the Seashore Middle Academy, Corpus Christi, Texas. || 
|-id=274
| 33274 Beaubingham ||  || Beau Taylor Bingham (born 1999) was a finalist in the 2017 Regeneron STS, and was awarded 2nd place at the 2016 ISEF for his medicine and health project. He attends the Cascia Hall Preparatory School, Tulsa, Oklahoma. || 
|-id=282
| 33282 Arjunramani ||  || Arjun Srinivasan Ramani (born 1998) was a finalist in the 2017 Regeneron STS, and was awarded 2nd place at the 2016 ISEF for his computer science project. He attends the West Lafayette Junior-Senior High School, West Lafayette, Indiana. || 
|-id=288
| 33288 Shixian ||  || Xian Shi (born 1983) of the Max-Planck Institute (Göttingen) analyzed image data of comet 67P/Churyumov-Gerasimenko taken by the OSIRIS camera system of the Rosetta mission to discover sunset and sunrise jets as well as the ejection of meter-size boulders by the local gas flow on the comet. || 
|-id=290
| 33290 Carloszuluaga ||  || Carlos A. Zuluaga (born 1982) is a Senior Research Support Associate at the Massachusetts Institute of Technology (Cambridge, MA). His work includes photometry and astrometry of Pluto and other trans-Neptunian bodies, particularly to predict and analyze stellar occultation observations. || 
|}

33301–33400 

|-id=319
| 33319 Kunqu ||  || Kunqu, one of the oldest forms of Chinese theater (opera), evolved from a melody, Kumshan diao, from the city of Kumshan. || 
|-id=328
| 33328 Archanaverma ||  || Archana Verma (born 1999) was a finalist in the 2017 Regeneron STS, and was awarded 1st place at the 2016 ISEF for her chemistry project. She attends the Jericho Senior High School, Jericho, New York. || 
|-id=329
| 33329 Stefanwan ||  || Stefan Wan (born 1999) was a finalist in the 2017 Regeneron STS, and was awarded 2nd place at the 2016 ISEF for his engineering project. He attends the Alexander W. Dreyfoos Jr. School of the Arts, West Palm Beach, Florida. || 
|-id=330
| 33330 Barèges || 1998 SW || Barèges, France, at the foot of the Pic du Midi || 
|-id=334
| 33334 Turon ||  || Catherine Turon (born 1944), a French astrometrist || 
|-id=335
| 33335 Guibert ||  || Jean Guibert (born 1937), a French astronomer. || 
|-id=337
| 33337 Amberyang ||  || Amber Zoe Yang (born 1999) was a finalist in the 2017 Regeneron STS, and was awarded 2nd place at the 2016 ISEF for her space science project. She attends the Trinity Preparatory School, Winter Park, Florida. || 
|-id=343
| 33343 Madorobin ||  || Mado Robin (1918–1960) was a French coloratura soprano, noted for her extreme vocal range. || 
|-id=344
| 33344 Madymesple ||  || Mady Mesplé (born 1931) was the leading French soprano between the 1950s and 1970s. She played Lakmé 145 times. She is one of the great dames of French opera. || 
|-id=345
| 33345 Nataliedessay ||  || Natalie Dessay (born 1965) is a French soprano and actress || 
|-id=346
| 33346 Sabinedevieilhe ||  || Sabine Devieilhe (born 1985) is a rising French soprano. She graduated with a first prize of the Conservatoire national supérieur de musique et de danse de Paris in 2011, and triumphed in Lakmé at the Opéra-comique in 2014. || 
|-id=347
| 33347 Maryzhu ||  || Mary Zhu (born 1998) was a finalist in the 2017 Regeneron STS, and was awarded 2nd place at the 2016 ISEF for her behavioral and social sciences project. She attended the Nashua High School South, Nashua, New Hampshire and now attends Stanford University in Stanford, CA. || 
|-id=348
| 33348 Stevelliott ||  || Steven Thomas Elliott (born 1998) was a finalist in the 2017 Regeneron STS, and was awarded 2nd place at the 2016 ISEF for his engineering project. He is homeschooled at the Magnolia Academy, Parker, Texas. || 
|-id=353
| 33353 Chattopadhyay ||  || Sambuddha Chattopadhyay (born 1999), a finalist in the 2017 Regeneron Science Talent Search, a science competition for high school seniors, for his physics project || 
|-id=372
| 33372 Jonathanchung ||  || Jonathan H Chung (born 1999), a finalist in the 2017 Regeneron Science Talent Search, a science competition for high school seniors, for his cellular and molecular biology project. || 
|-id=376
| 33376 Medi ||  || Enrico Medi (1911–1974), Italian physicist who was director of the National Institute of Geophysics and vice president of the European Atomic Energy Community. || 
|-id=377
| 33377 Večerníček ||  || Večerníček, Czech television animated figure || 
|-id=379
| 33379 Rohandalvi ||  || Rohan Dalvi (born 1999) is a finalist in the 2017 Regeneron Science Talent Search, a science competition for high school seniors, for his chemistry project. || 
|-id=382
| 33382 Indranidas ||  || Indrani Das (born 1999), a finalist in the 2017 Regeneron Science Talent Search, a science competition for high school seniors, for her medicine and health project. || 
|-id=383
| 33383 Edupuganti ||  || Vineet Edupuganti (born 1999), a finalist in the 2017 Regeneron Science Talent Search, a science competition for high school seniors, for his engineering project. || 
|-id=384
| 33384 Jacyfang ||  || Jacy Fang (born 1999), a finalist in the 2017 Regeneron Science Talent Search, a science competition for high school seniors, for her medicine and health project. || 
|-id=389
| 33389 Isairisgreco ||  || Isabella Iris Greco (born 1999), a finalist in the 2017 Regeneron Science Talent Search, a science competition for high school seniors, for her behavioral and social sciences project. || 
|-id=390
| 33390 Hajlasz ||  || Natalia Hajlasz (born 2000), a finalist in the 2017 Regeneron Science Talent Search, a science competition for high school seniors, for her chemistry project. || 
|-id=392
| 33392 Blakehord ||  || Blake Hord (born 1999), a finalist in the 2017 Regeneron Science Talent Search, a science competition for high school seniors, for his space science project. || 
|-id=393
| 33393 Khandelwal ||  || Apoorv Khandelwal (born 1999), a finalist in the 2017 Regeneron Science Talent Search, a science competition for high school seniors, for his materials science project. || 
|-id=394
| 33394 Nathaniellee ||  || Nathaniel Paul Lee (born 1999), a finalist in the 2017 Regeneron Science Talent Search, a science competition for high school seniors, for his physics project. || 
|-id=395
| 33395 Dylanli ||  || Dylan Li (born 1999), a finalist in the 2017 Regeneron Science Talent Search, a science competition for high school seniors, for his medicine and health project. || 
|-id=396
| 33396 Vrindamadan ||  || Vrinda Madan (born 1999), a finalist in the 2017 Regeneron Science Talent Search, a science competition for high school seniors, for her cellular and molecular biology project. || 
|-id=397
| 33397 Prathiknaidu ||  || Prathik Naidu (born 1999), a finalist in the 2017 Regeneron Science Talent Search, a science competition for high school seniors, for his computational biology and bioinformatics project. || 
|-id=399
| 33399 Emilyann ||  || Emily Ann Peterson (born 1999), a finalist in the 2017 Regeneron Science Talent Search, a science competition for high school seniors, for her cellular and molecular biology project. || 
|-id=400
| 33400 Laurapierson ||  || Laura Catherine Pierson (born 1999) is a finalist in the 2017 Regeneron Science Talent Search, a science competition for high school seniors, for her mathematics project. She attends the College Preparatory School, Oakland, California. || 
|}

33401–33500 

|-
| 33401 Radiya-Dixit ||  || Evani Radiya-Dixit (born 1999) is a finalist in the 2017 Regeneron Science Talent Search, a science competition for high school seniors, for her computational biology and bioinformatics project. She attends the Harker School, San Jose, California. || 
|-id=402
| 33402 Canizares ||  || Claude R. Canizares (born 1945) is a renowned physicist, the Bruno Rossi Professor of Physics at MIT, Associate Director of the Chandra X-ray Observatory, and former director of MIT's Center for Space Research. || 
|-id=405
| 33405 Rekhtman ||  || David Boris Rekhtman (born 1998) is a finalist in the 2017 Regeneron Science Talent Search, a science competition for high school seniors, for his medicine and health project. He attends the Walt Whitman High School, Bethesda, Maryland. || 
|-id=406
| 33406 Saltzman ||  || Audrey Saltzman (born 1999) is a finalist in the 2017 Regeneron Science Talent Search, a science competition for high school seniors, for her space science project. She attends the Byram Hills High School, Armonk, New York. || 
|-id=408
| 33408 Mananshah ||  || Manan Ajay Shah (born 1999) is a finalist in the 2017 Regeneron Science Talent Search, a science competition for high school seniors, for his computational biology and bioinformatics project. He attends the Harker School, San Jose, California. || 
|-id=412
| 33412 Arjunsubra ||  || Arjun Subramaniam (born 1999) is a finalist in the 2017 Regeneron Science Talent Search, a science competition for high school seniors, for his computational biology and bioinformatics project. He attends the Harker School, San Jose, California. || 
|-id=413
| 33413 Alecsun ||  || Alec Sun (born 1998) is a finalist in the 2017 Regeneron Science Talent Search, a science competition for high school seniors, for his mathematics project. He attends the Phillips Exeter Academy, Exeter, New Hampshire. || 
|-id=414
| 33414 Jessicatian ||  || Jessica C Tian (born 1999) is a finalist in the 2017 Regeneron Science Talent Search, a science competition for high school seniors, for her chemistry project. She attends the Del Norte High School, San Diego, California. || 
|-id=415
| 33415 Felixwang ||  || Felix Wang (born 1998) is a finalist in the 2017 Regeneron Science Talent Search, a science competition for high school seniors, for his mathematics project. He attends the Roxbury Latin School, West Roxbury, Massachusetts. || 
|-id=418
| 33418 Jacksonweaver ||  || Jackson Barker Weaver (born 1999) is a finalist in the 2017 Regeneron Science Talent Search, a science competition for high school seniors, for his biochemistry project. He attends the Dr. Ronald E. McNair Academic High School, Jersey City, New Jersey. || 
|-id=419
| 33419 Wellman ||  || Julian Wellman (born 1998) is a finalist in the 2017 Regeneron Science Talent Search, a science competition for high school seniors, for his mathematics project. He attends the Greenhills School, Ann Arbor, Michigan. || 
|-id=420
| 33420 Derekwoo ||  || Derek Woo (born 1999) is a finalist in the 2017 Regeneron Science Talent Search, a science competition for high school seniors, for his environmental science project. He attends the Greenwich High School, Greenwich, Connecticut. || 
|-id=421
| 33421 Byronxu ||  || Byron Lee Xu (born 1999) is a finalist in the 2017 Regeneron Science Talent Search, a science competition for high school seniors, for his earth and planetary project. He attends the William P. Clements High School, Sugar Land, Texas. || 
|-id=433
| 33433 Maurilia ||  || Maurilia Sposetti, sister of the discoverer † || 
|-id=434
| 33434 Scottmanley || 1999 FU || Scott Manley (born 1972) is a popular science communicator, best known for his videos on YouTube combining science and games. A software engineer trained as an astrophysicist, he created visualizations of the asteroid belt and near-Earth asteroids. || 
|-id=440
| 33440 Nicholasprato ||  || Nicholas Prato (born 1952) is an artist/craftsman who is a science, space and astronomy enthusiast and supporter. He has worked on the reduction of infrared spectra taken at the Keck II telescope. || 
|-id=441
| 33441 Catherineprato ||  || Catherine Coulacos Prato (born 1957) is a writer, editor, and supporter of women and other underrepresented groups in science and academia. || 
|-id=446
| 33446 Michaelyang ||  || Michael Yang (born 1998) is a finalist in the 2017 Regeneron Science Talent Search, a science competition for high school seniors, for his computational biology and bioinformatics project. He attends the Charlotte Latin School, Charlotte, North Carolina. || 
|-id=448
| 33448 Aaronyeiser ||  || Aaron Joseph Yeiser (born 1998) is a finalist in the 2017 Regeneron Science Talent Search, a science competition for high school seniors, for his mathematics project. He attends the Perkiomen Valley High School, Collegeville, Pennsylvania. || 
|-id=450
| 33450 Allender ||  || Kate Allender mentored a finalist in the 2017 Regeneron Science Talent Search, a science competition for high school seniors. She teaches at the Tesla STEM High School, Redmond, Washington. || 
|-id=451
| 33451 Michaelarney ||  || Michael Arney mentored a finalist in the 2017 Regeneron Science Talent Search, a science competition for high school seniors. He teaches at the Trinity Preparatory School, Winter Park, Florida. || 
|-id=452
| 33452 Olivebryan ||  || Olive Bryan mentored a finalist in the 2017 Regeneron Science Talent Search, a science competition for high school seniors. She teaches at the Alexander W. Dreyfoos Jr. School of the Arts, West Palm Beach, Florida. || 
|-id=453
| 33453 Townley ||  || Townley Chisholm mentored a finalist in the 2017 Regeneron Science Talent Search, a science competition for high school seniors. He teaches at the Phillips Exeter Academy, Exeter, New Hampshire. || 
|-id=454
| 33454 Neilclaffey ||  || Neil Claffey mentored a finalist in the 2017 Regeneron Science Talent Search, a science competition for high school seniors. He teaches at the Nashua High School South, Nashua, New Hampshire. || 
|-id=455
| 33455 Coakley ||  || Jack Coakley mentored a finalist in the 2017 Regeneron Science Talent Search, a science competition for high school seniors. He teaches at the College Preparatory School, Oakland, California. || 
|-id=456
| 33456 Ericacurran ||  || Erica Curran mentored a finalist in the 2017 Regeneron Science Talent Search, a science competition for high school seniors. She teaches at the Dobbs Ferry High School, Dobbs Ferry, New York. || 
|-id=457
| 33457 Cutillo ||  || Mary Cutillo mentored a finalist in the 2017 Regeneron Science Talent Search, a science competition for high school seniors. She teaches at the Perkiomen Valley High School, Collegeville, Pennsylvania. || 
|-id=458
| 33458 Fialkow ||  || Joshua Fialkow mentored a finalist in the 2017 Regeneron Science Talent Search, a science competition for high school seniors. He teaches at the Bronx High School of Science, Bronx, New York. || 
|-id=462
| 33462 Tophergee ||  || Topher Gee mentored a finalist in the 2017 Regeneron Science Talent Search, a science competition for high school seniors. He teaches at the Charlotte Latin School, Charlotte, North Carolina. || 
|-id=463
| 33463 Bettinagregg ||  || Bettina Gregg mentored a finalist in the 2017 Regeneron Science Talent Search, a science competition for high school seniors. She teaches at the Oregon Episcopal School, Portland, Oregon. || 
|-id=464
| 33464 Melahudock ||  || Melanie L. Hudock mentored a finalist in the 2017 Regeneron Science Talent Search, a science competition for high school seniors. She teaches at the Walt Whitman High School, Bethesda, Maryland. || 
|-id=466
| 33466 Thomaslarson ||  || Thomas G. Larson mentored a finalist in the 2017 Regeneron Science Talent Search, a science competition for high school seniors. He teaches at the Thomas Jefferson High School for Science and Technology, Alexandria, Virginia. || 
|-id=467
| 33467 Johnlieb ||  || John Michael Lieb mentored a finalist in the 2017 Regeneron Science Talent Search, a science competition for high school seniors. He teaches at the Roxbury Latin School, West Roxbury, Massachusetts. || 
|-id=468
| 33468 Nelsoneric ||  || Eric R. Nelson mentored a finalist in the 2017 Regeneron Science Talent Search, a science competition for high school seniors. He teaches at the Harker School, San Jose, California. || 
|-id=471
| 33471 Ozuna ||  || Kenneth Ozuna mentored a finalist in the 2017 Regeneron Science Talent Search, a science competition for high school seniors. He teaches at the Del Norte High School, San Diego, California. || 
|-id=472
| 33472 Yunorperalta ||  || Yunor Peralta mentored a finalist in the 2017 Regeneron Science Talent Search, a science competition for high school seniors. He teaches at the Mission San Jose High School, Fremont, California. || 
|-id=473
| 33473 Porterfield ||  || Pam Porterfield mentored a finalist in the 2017 Regeneron Science Talent Search, a science competition for high school seniors. She teaches at the West Lafayette Junior-Senior High School, West Lafayette, Indiana. || 
|-id=476
| 33476 Gilanareiss ||  || Gilana Reiss mentored a finalist in the 2017 Regeneron Science Talent Search, a science competition for high school seniors. She teaches at the Hunter College High School, New York, New York. || 
|-id=478
| 33478 Deniselivon || 1999 GB || Denise Selivon, Brazilian biologist and professor at the University of São Paulo || 
|-id=480
| 33480 Bartolucci ||  || Osvaldo Bartolucci, Italian director of the Osservatorio Astronomico di Alpette || 
|-id=489
| 33489 Myungjinkim ||  || Myung-Jin Kim (born 1978) is a senior research scientist at the Korea Astronomy and Space Science Institute. His research includes the photometric characterization of asteroids, involvement in the Hayabusa2 mission to asteroid (162173) Ryugu, and contributions to the large-scale KMTNet and OWL-Net surveys. || 
|-id=492
| 33492 Christirogers ||  || Christine Rogers mentored a finalist in the 2017 Regeneron Science Talent Search, a science competition for high school seniors. She teaches at the Hendrick Hudson High School, Montrose, New York. || 
|-id=495
| 33495 Schaferjames ||  || James R. Schafer mentored a finalist in the 2017 Regeneron Science Talent Search, a science competition for high school seniors. He teaches at the Montgomery Blair High School, Silver Spring, Maryland. || 
|-id=498
| 33498 Juliesmith ||  || Julie Smith mentored a finalist in the 2017 Regeneron Science Talent Search, a science competition for high school seniors. She teaches at the Greenhills School, Ann Arbor, Michigan. || 
|-id=499
| 33499 Stanton ||  || Jeremy Stanton mentored a finalist in the 2017 Regeneron Science Talent Search, a science competition for high school seniors. He teaches at the Dr. Ronald E. McNair Academic High School, Jersey City, New Jersey. || 
|}

33501–33600 

|-
| 33501 Juliethompson ||  || Julie Thompson mentored a finalist in the 2017 Regeneron Science Talent Search, a science competition for high school seniors. She teaches at the William P. Clements High School, Sugar Land, Texas. || 
|-id=502
| 33502 Janetwaldeck ||  || Janet Waldeck mentored a finalist in the 2017 Regeneron Science Talent Search, a science competition for high school seniors. She teaches at the Taylor Allderdice High School, Pittsburgh, Pennsylvania. || 
|-id=503
| 33503 Dasilvaborges ||  || Luiz Fernando da Silva Borges (born 1998) was awarded best of category and first place in the 2016 Intel International Science and Engineering Fair for his biomedical engineering project. He also received the Philip V. Streich Memorial Award. || 
|-id=504
| 33504 Rebrouwer ||  || Rachel Elizabeth Brouwer (born 2002) was awarded second place in the 2016 Intel International Science and Engineering Fair for her earth and environmental sciences project. || 
|-id=508
| 33508 Drewnik ||  || Dennis Adrian Drewnik (born 1998) was awarded best of category and first place in the 2016 Intel International Science and Engineering Fair for his plant sciences project. He also received the Dudley R. Herschbach SIYSS Award || 
|-id=509
| 33509 Mogilny ||  || Daniel Mogilny (born 1998) was awarded second place in the 2016 Intel International Science and Engineering Fair for his systems software project. || 
|-id=511
| 33511 Austinwang ||  || Han Jie (Austin) Wang (born 1998) was awarded best of category and first place in the 2016 Intel International Science and Engineering Fair for his microbiology project. He also received the Gordon E. Moore Award. || 
|-id=514
| 33514 Changpeihsuan ||  || Chang Pei-Hsuan (born 1998) was awarded best of category and first place in the 2016 Intel International Science and Engineering Fair for her math project. She also received the European Union Contest for Young Scientists Award. || 
|-id=515
| 33515 Linbohan ||  || Lin Bo-Han (born 1998) was awarded second place in the 2016 Intel International Science and Engineering Fair for his physics and astronomy project. || 
|-id=516
| 33516 Timonen ||  || Petteri Timonen (born 1997) was awarded second place in the 2016 Intel International Science and Engineering Fair for his systems software project. || 
|-id=517
| 33517 Paulfoltin ||  || Paul Foltin (born 1999) was awarded second place in the 2016 Intel International Science and Engineering Fair for his embedded systems team project. He attends the Franz-Haniel-Gymnasium, Duisburg, Germany. || 
|-id=518
| 33518 Stoetzer ||  || Myrijam Stoetzer (born 2001) was awarded second place in the 2016 Intel International Science and Engineering Fair for her embedded systems team project. She attends the Franz-Haniel-Gymnasium, Duisburg, Germany. || 
|-id=520
| 33520 Ichige ||  || Takahiro Ichige (born 1998) was awarded best of category and first place in the 2016 Intel International Science and Engineering Fair for his engineering mechanics project. He attends the Chiba Municipal High School, Chiba-City, Chiba-pref., Japan. || 
|-id=522
| 33522 Chizumimaeta ||  || Chizumi Maeta (born 1997) was awarded second place in the 2016 Intel International Science and Engineering Fair for her energy team project. She attends the Yonago National College of Technology, Yonago-City, Tottori-pref., Japan. || 
|-id=523
| 33523 Warashina ||  || Tomoro Warashina (born 1997) was awarded second place in the 2016 Intel International Science and Engineering Fair for his cellular and molecular biology project. He attends the Yokohama Science Frontier High School, Yokohama-City, Kanagawa-pref., Japan. || 
|-id=525
| 33525 Teresinha ||  || Teresinha Rodrigues (born 1957) is a researcher at the Observatorio Nacional in Rio de Janeiro (Brazil). She played a fundamental role in the implementation of outreach programs at the Observatorio Astronomico do Sertão de Itaparica (Brazil) dedicated to the study of small Solar System bodies. || 
|-id=528
| 33528 Jinzeman || 1999 HL || Jindřich Zeman, Czech amateur astronomer, winner of the František Nušl Award of the Czech Astronomical Society in 1942 || 
|-id=529
| 33529 Henden ||  || Arne A. Henden, American astronomer, co-author of Astronomical Photometry, director of the American Association of Variable Star Observers (AAVSO) || 
|-id=532
| 33532 Gabriellacoli ||  || Gabriella Coli, Italian elementary school teacher of the first discoverer || 
|-id=534
| 33534 Meiyamamura ||  || Mei Yamamura (born 1998) was awarded second place in the 2016 Intel International Science and Engineering Fair for her energy team project. She attends the Yonago National College of Technology, Yonago-city, Tottori-pref., Japan. || 
|-id=535
| 33535 Alshaikh ||  || Fatimah Abdulmonem Alshaikh (born 1998) was awarded second place in the 2016 Intel International Science and Engineering Fair for her plant sciences project. She attends the Al Faisaliah Islamic Schools, Khobar, Saudi Arabia. || 
|-id=536
| 33536 Charpugdee ||  || Runglawan Charpugdee (born 1998) was awarded second place in the 2016 Intel International Science and Engineering Fair for her animal sciences team project. She attends the Damrongratsongkroh School, Chiang Rai, Thailand. || 
|-id=537
| 33537 Doungnga ||  || Charuntorn Doungnga (born 1998) was awarded second place in the 2016 Intel International Science and Engineering Fair for her animal sciences team project. She attends the Damrongratsongkroh School, Chiang Rai, Thailand. || 
|-id=538
| 33538 Jaredbergen ||  || Jared Randolph Bergen (born 1998) was awarded second place in the 2016 Intel International Science and Engineering Fair for his animal sciences project. He attends the Sayville High School, West Sayville, New York, U.S.A. || 
|-id=539
| 33539 Elenaberman ||  || Elena Alexandra Berman (born 1999) was awarded second place in the 2016 Intel International Science and Engineering Fair for her computational biology and bioinformatics team project. She attends the Breck School, Golden Valley, Minnesota, U.S.A. || 
|-id=544
| 33544 Jerold ||  || Jerold Z. Kaplan, American physician, surgeon, and amateur astronomer || 
|-id=550
| 33550 Blackburn ||  || Lee Blackburn (born 1998) was awarded second place in the 2016 Intel International Science and Engineering Fair for his energy project. He attends the Lawrence High School, Cedarhurst, New York, U.S.A. || 
|-id=553
| 33553 Nagai ||  || Nagai, Yamagata prefecture, Japan, where a meteorite fell in 1922 || 
|-id=555
| 33555 Nataliebush ||  || Natalie Marie Bush (born 1998) was awarded best of category and first place in the 2016 Intel International Science and Engineering Fair for her earth and environmental sciences project. She also received the Intel and Indo-US Science & Technology Forum Award. She attends the Saint Josephs Academy, Baton Rouge, Louisiana, U.S.A. || 
|-id=556
| 33556 Brennanclark ||  || Brennan Scott Clark (born 1997) was awarded best of category and first place in the 2016 Intel International Science and Engineering Fair for his translational medical science team project. He attends the Breck School, Golden Valley, Minnesota, U.S.A. || 
|-id=559
| 33559 Laurencooper ||  || Lauren Cooper (born 1999) was awarded second place in the 2016 Intel International Science and Engineering Fair for her materials science project. She attends the Lake Oswego High School, Lake Oswego, Oregon, U.S.A. || 
|-id=560
| 33560 D'Alessandro ||  || Alexis Maria D´Alessandro (born 1997) was awarded second place in the 2016 Intel International Science and Engineering Fair for her environmental engineering project. She attends the Half Hollow Hills High School West, Dix Hills, New York, U.S.A. || 
|-id=561
| 33561 Brianjasondu ||  || Brian Jason Du (born 1998) was awarded second place in the 2016 Intel International Science and Engineering Fair for his cellular and molecular biology project. He attends the Plano West Senior High School, Plano, Texas, U.S.A. || 
|-id=562
| 33562 Amydunphy ||  || Amy Dunphy (born 2000) was awarded second place in the 2016 Intel International Science and Engineering Fair for her chemistry project. She attends the Harker School, San Jose, California, U.S.A. || 
|-id=564
| 33564 Miriamshira ||  || Miriam Shira Eisenberg (born 1998) was awarded second place in the 2016 Intel International Science and Engineering Fair for her behavioral and social sciences project. She attends the North Shore Hebrew Academy High School, Great Neck, New York, U.S.A. || 
|-id=565
| 33565 Samferguson ||  || Samuel Ferguson (born 1999) was awarded second place in the 2016 Intel International Science and Engineering Fair for her biomedical engineering project. She attends the Christian Unified High School, El Cajon, California, U.S.A. || 
|-id=567
| 33567 Sulekhfrederic ||  || Sulekh Frederic Fernando-Peiris (born 2000) was awarded second place in the 2016 Intel International Science and Engineering Fair for his physics and astronomy project. He attends the Mount Vernon High School, Mount Vernon, Ohio, U.S.A. || 
|-id=568
| 33568 Godishala ||  || Prashant Sai Godishala (born 1998) was awarded best of category and first place in the 2016 Intel International Science and Engineering Fair for his translational medical science team project. He attends the Breck School, Golden Valley, Minnesota, U.S.A. || 
|-id=569
| 33569 Nikhilgopal ||  || Nikhil Sajan Gopal (born 2000) was awarded second place in the 2016 Intel International Science and Engineering Fair for his microbiology project. He attends the Lawrenceville School, Lawerenceville, New Jersey, U.S.A. || 
|-id=570
| 33570 Jagruenstein ||  || Joshua Aaron Gruenstein (born 1999) was awarded second place in the 2016 Intel International Science and Engineering Fair for his robotics and intelligent machines team project. He attends the Horace Mann School, Bronx, New York, U.S.A. || 
|-id=571
| 33571 Jaygupta ||  || Jay Gupta (born 1998) was awarded second place in the 2016 Intel International Science and Engineering Fair for his cellular and molecular biology project. He attends the Thomas Jefferson High School for Science and Technology, Alexandria, Virginia, U.S.A. || 
|-id=572
| 33572 Mandolin ||  || Mandolin Harris (born 1997) was awarded second place in the 2016 Intel International Science and Engineering Fair for her earth and environmental sciences project. She attends the Arkansas School for Mathematics, Sciences and the Arts, Hot Springs, Arkansas, U.S.A. || 
|-id=573
| 33573 Hugrace ||  || Grace Hu (born 1999) was awarded first place in the 2016 Intel International Science and Engineering Fair for her materials science project. She attends the Jericho High School, Jericho, New York, U.S.A. || 
|-id=574
| 33574 Shailaja ||  || Shailaja Humane (born 1997) was awarded second place in the 2016 Intel International Science and Engineering Fair for her physics and astronomy project. She attends the Watchung Hills Regional High School, Warren, New Jersey, U.S.A. || 
|-id=575
| 33575 Joshuajacob ||  || Joshua Murphy Jacob (born 1999) was awarded first place in the 2016 Intel International Science and Engineering Fair for his engineering mechanics project. He attends the Saint Xavier High School, Louisville, Kentucky, U.S.A. || 
|-id=580
| 33580 Priyankajain ||  || Priyanka Jain (born 1998) was awarded second place in the 2016 Intel International Science and Engineering Fair for her biomedical and health sciences project. She attends the La Cueva High School, Albuquerque, New Mexico, U.S.A. || 
|-id=581
| 33581 Rajeevjha ||  || Rajeev Jha (born 1998) was awarded best of category and first place in the 2016 Intel International Science and Engineering Fair for his behavioral and social sciences project. He also received the European Union Contest for Young Scientists Award. He attends the President Theodore Roosevelt High School, Honolulu, Hawaii, U.S.A. || 
|-id=582
| 33582 Tiashajoardar ||  || Tiasha Joardar (born 1998) was awarded best of category and first place in the 2016 Intel International Science and Engineering Fair for her energy project. She also received the Innovation Exploration Award. She attends the Plano West Senior High School, Plano, Texas, U.S.A. || 
|-id=583
| 33583 Karamchedu ||  || Chaitanya Dasharathi Karamchedu (born 1999) was awarded second place in the 2016 Intel International Science and Engineering Fair for his environmental engineering project. He attends the Jesuit High School, Portland, Oregon, U.S.A. || 
|-id=584
| 33584 Austinkatzer ||  || Austin Wolfgang Katzer (born 1999) was awarded second place in the 2016 Intel International Science and Engineering Fair for his animal sciences team project. He attends the Jasper High School, Plano, Texas, U.S.A. || 
|-id=586
| 33586 Keeley ||  || Charlotte Underwood Keeley (born 1998) was awarded first place in the 2016 Intel International Science and Engineering Fair for her plant sciences project. She attends the Ossining High School, Ossining, New York, U.S.A. || 
|-id=587
| 33587 Arianakim ||  || Ariana Kim (born 1998) was awarded second place in the 2016 Intel International Science and Engineering Fair for her environmental engineering team project. She attends the Saint Andrew's Priory School, Honolulu, Hawaii, U.S.A. || 
|-id=589
| 33589 Edwardkim ||  || Edward Sangyoon Kim (born 1999) was awarded best of category and first place in the 2016 Intel International Science and Engineering Fair for his biochemistry project. He also received the Intel and Indo-US Science & Technology Forum Award. He attends the Midway High School, Waco, Texas, U.S.A. || 
|-id=590
| 33590 Sreelakshmi ||  || Sreelakshmi Kutty (born 1998) was awarded second place in the 2016 Intel International Science and Engineering Fair for her environmental engineering team project. She attends the Saint Andrew's Priory School, Honolulu, Hawaii, U.S.A. || 
|-id=591
| 33591 Landsberger ||  || Huws Yoshito Landsberger (born 1998) was awarded second place in the 2016 Intel International Science and Engineering Fair for his physics and astronomy project. He attends the Palos Verdes Peninsula High School, Rolling Hills Estates, California, U.S.A. || 
|-id=592
| 33592 Kathrynanna ||  || Kathryn Anna Lawrence (born 1998) was awarded best of category and first place in the 2016 Intel International Science and Engineering Fair for her chemistry team project. She also received the Intel Foundation Cultural and Scientific Visit to China Award. She attends the Fairview High School, Boulder, Colorado, U.S.A. || 
|-id=594
| 33594 Ralphlawton ||  || Ralph Ignacio Lawton (born 1998) was awarded second place in the 2016 Intel International Science and Engineering Fair for his biomedical and health sciences project. He attends the Pennsylvania Leadership Charter School, West Chester, Pennsylvania, U.S.A. || 
|-id=595
| 33595 Jiwoolee ||  || Jiwoo Lee (born 1999) was awarded best of category and first place in the 2016 Intel International Science and Engineering Fair for her biomedical and health sciences project. She also received the Intel and Indo-US Science & Technology Forum Award. She attends the Academy for Medical Science Technology, Hackensack, NJ, U.S.A. || 
|-id=596
| 33596 Taesoolee ||  || Taesoo Daniel Lee (born 1998) was awarded second place in the 2016 Intel International Science and Engineering Fair for his materials science project. He attends the North Carolina School of Science and Mathematics, Durham, North Carolina, U.S.A. || 
|-id=598
| 33598 Christineliu ||  || Christine Joy Liu (born 1999) was awarded second place in the 2016 Intel International Science and Engineering Fair for her computational biology and bioinformatics project. She attends the Westminster Schools, Atlanta, Georgia, U.S.A. || 
|-id=599
| 33599 Mckennaloop ||  || McKenna Kristin Loop (born 1999) was awarded second place in the 2016 Intel International Science and Engineering Fair for her energy project. She attends the Arizona College Preparatory- Erie, Chandler, Arizona, U.S.A. || 
|-id=600
| 33600 Davidlu ||  || David M. Lu (born 1997) was awarded second place in the 2016 Intel International Science and Engineering Fair for his microbiology project. He attends the Mills E. Godwin High School, Henrico, Virginia, U.S.A. || 
|}

33601–33700 

|-id=602
| 33602 Varunmandi ||  || Varun Mandi (born 1998) was awarded second place in the 2016 Intel International Science and Engineering Fair for his biomedical and health sciences project. He attends the Troy High School, Fullerton, California, U.S.A. || 
|-id=603
| 33603 Saramason ||  || Sara Mason (born 1998) was awarded second place in the 2016 Intel International Science and Engineering Fair for her embedded systems team project. She attends the Merrimack High School, Merrimack, New Hampshire, U.S.A. || 
|-id=604
| 33604 McChesney ||  || Evelyn Grace McChesney (born 1999) was awarded second place in the 2016 Intel International Science and Engineering Fair for her biomedical engineering team project. She attends the Breck School, Golden Valley, Minnesota, U.S.A. || 
|-id=605
| 33605 McCue ||  || Madeline Chawla McCue (born 1998) was awarded second place in the 2016 Intel International Science and Engineering Fair for her biomedical engineering team project. She attends the Breck School, Golden Valley, Minnesota, U.S.A. || 
|-id=606
| 33606 Brandonmuncan ||  || Brandon Michael Muncan (born 1999) was awarded second place in the 2016 Intel International Science and Engineering Fair for his translational medical science project. He attends the Queens High School for the Sciences at York College, Jamaica, New York, U.S.A. || 
|-id=607
| 33607 Archanamurali ||  || Archana Bhagyalakshmi Murali (born 1999) was awarded second place in the 2016 Intel International Science and Engineering Fair for her computational biology and bioinformatics team project. She attends the Breck School, Golden Valley, Minnesota, U.S.A. || 
|-id=608
| 33608 Paladugu ||  || Praharshasai Paladugu (born 1999) was awarded second place in the 2016 Intel International Science and Engineering Fair for his translational medical science project. He attends the duPont Manual High School, Louisville, Kentucky, U.S.A. || 
|-id=609
| 33609 Harishpalani ||  || Harish Palani (born 2000) was awarded second place in the 2016 Intel International Science and Engineering Fair for his earth and environmental sciences project. He attends the Sunset High School, Portland, Oregon, U.S.A. || 
|-id=610
| 33610 Payra ||  || Syamantak Payra (born 2001) was awarded best of category and first place in the 2016 Intel International Science and Engineering Fair for his embedded systems project. He also received the Intel Foundation Young Scientist Award. He attends the Clear Brook High School, Friendswood, Texas, U.S.A. || 
|-id=613
| 33613 Pendharkar ||  || Aarushi Iris Pendharkar (born 2001) was awarded second place in the 2016 Intel International Science and Engineering Fair for her biomedical and health sciences project. She attends the Massachusetts Academy of Math and Science, Worcester, Massachusetts, U.S.A. || 
|-id=614
| 33614 Meganploch ||  || Megan Coral Ploch (born 1999) was awarded second place in the 2016 Intel International Science and Engineering Fair for her environmental engineering project. She attends the Pelham Memorial High School, Pelham, New York, U.S.A. || 
|-id=617
| 33617 Kailashraman ||  || Kailash Raman (born 1999) was awarded second place in the 2016 Intel International Science and Engineering Fair for his chemistry project. He attends the Sandra Day O'Connor High School, Phoenix, Arizona, U.S.A. || 
|-id=619
| 33619 Dominickrowan ||  || Dominick Michael Rowan (born 1998) was awarded first place in the 2016 Intel International Science and Engineering Fair for his physics and astronomy project. He attends the Byram Hills High School, Armonk, New York, U.S.A. || 
|-id=621
| 33621 Sathish ||  || Sanjeev-Kumar Mamalapuram Sathish (born 1999) was awarded first place in the 2016 Intel International Science and Engineering Fair for his cellular and molecular biology project. || 
|-id=622
| 33622 Sedigh ||  || Kameron Sedigh (born 1998) was awarded second place in the 2016 Intel International Science and Engineering Fair for his biochemistry project. || 
|-id=623
| 33623 Kyraseevers ||  || Kyra Leigh Seevers (born 1998) was awarded second place in the 2016 Intel International Science and Engineering Fair for her engineering mechanics project. || 
|-id=624
| 33624 Omersiddiqui ||  || Omer Siddiqui (born 1999) was awarded second place in the 2016 Intel International Science and Engineering Fair for his math project. || 
|-id=625
| 33625 Slepyan ||  || Ariel Slepyan (born 1998) was awarded second place in the 2016 Intel International Science and Engineering Fair for his microbiology project. || 
|-id=626
| 33626 Jasonsmith ||  || Jason Tanner Smith (born 1999) was awarded second place in the 2016 Intel International Science and Engineering Fair for his animal sciences team project. || 
|-id=628
| 33628 Spettel ||  || Matthew Thomas Spettel (born 1997) was awarded second place in the 2016 Intel International Science and Engineering Fair for his embedded systems team project. || 
|-id=630
| 33630 Swathiravi ||  || Swathi Ravi Srinivasan (born 1999) was awarded second place in the 2016 Intel International Science and Engineering Fair for her biochemistry project. || 
|-id=633
| 33633 Strickland ||  || Edmond Bruce Strickland (born 1998) was awarded second place in the 2016 Intel International Science and Engineering Fair for his engineering mechanics project. || 
|-id=634
| 33634 Strickler ||  || Sarah Kay Strickler (born 1997) was awarded second place in the 2016 Intel International Science and Engineering Fair for her microbiology project. || 
|-id=655
| 33655 Sumathipala ||  || Marissa Sumathipala (born 2000) was awarded best of category and first place in the 2016 Intel International Science and Engineering Fair for her cellular and molecular biology project. She attends the Broad Run High School, Ashburn, Virginia, U.S.A. || 
|-id=660
| 33660 Rishishankar ||  || Rishi Shankar Sundaresan (born 1998) was awarded second place in the 2016 Intel International Science and Engineering Fair for his energy project. || 
|-id=661
| 33661 Sophiaswartz ||  || Sophia Edith Swartz (born 2000) was awarded second place in the 2016 Intel International Science and Engineering Fair for her plant sciences project. || 
|-id=662
| 33662 Tacescu ||  || Alex Cristian Tacescu (born 1998) was awarded second place in the 2016 Intel International Science and Engineering Fair for his engineering mechanics project. || 
|-id=667
| 33667 Uttripathii ||  || Uttkarshni Tripathii (born 2000) was awarded second place in the 2016 Intel International Science and Engineering Fair for her earth and environmental sciences project. || 
|-id=677
| 33677 Truell ||  || Michael Truell (born 2000) was awarded second place in the 2016 Intel International Science and Engineering Fair for his robotics and intelligent machines team project. || 
|-id=680
| 33680 Vasconcelos ||  || Francisca Vasconcelos (born 1998) was awarded second place in the 2016 Intel International Science and Engineering Fair for her robotics and intelligent machines project. || 
|-id=681
| 33681 Wamsley ||  || Nick A.Wamsley (born 1999) was awarded first place in the 2016 Intel International Science and Engineering Fair for his microbiology project. || 
|-id=682
| 33682 Waylonreid ||  || Waylon Reid Williams (born 1997) was awarded first place in the 2016 Intel International Science and Engineering Fair for his environmental engineering project. || 
|-id=684
| 33684 Xiaomichael ||  || Michael Xiao (born 1998) was awarded first place in the 2016 Intel International Science and Engineering Fair for his biomedical and health sciences project. || 
|-id=685
| 33685 Younglove ||  || Katherine Afton Younglove (born 1998) was awarded best of category and first place in the 2016 Intel International Science and Engineering Fair for her chemistry team project. She also received the Intel Foundation Cultural and Scientific Visit to China Award. || 
|-id=687
| 33687 Julianbain ||  || Julian Manitou Bain (born 2003) is a finalist in the 2017 Broadcom MASTERS, a math and science competition for middle school students, for his electrical and mechanical engineering project. He attends the Missoula International School, Missoula, Montana. || 
|-id=688
| 33688 Meghnabehari ||  || Meghna Swaminathan Behari (born 2002) is a finalist in the 2017 Broadcom MASTERS, a math and science competition for middle school students, for her materials & bioengineering project. She attends the Marshall Middle School, Wexford, Pennsylvania. || 
|-id=690
| 33690 Noahcain ||  || Noah Miles Cain (born 2005) is a finalist in the 2017 Broadcom MASTERS, a math and science competition for middle school students, for his environmental and earth sciences project. He attends the Krystal School of Science, Math, and Technology, Hesperia, California. || 
|-id=691
| 33691 Andrewchiang ||  || Andrew Chiang (born 2002) is a finalist in the 2017 Broadcom MASTERS, a math and science competition for middle school students, for his electrical and mechanical engineering project. He attends the BASIS Independent Silicon Valley, San Jose, California. || 
|-id=696
| 33696 Crouchley ||  || Austin Vincent Crouchley (born 2003) is a finalist in the 2017 Broadcom MASTERS, a math and science competition for middle school students, for his electrical and mechanical engineering project. He attends the Garden City Middle School, Garden City, New York. || 
|-id=699
| 33699 Jessiegan ||  || Jessie Low Gan (born 2003) is a finalist in the 2017 Broadcom MASTERS, a math and science competition for middle school students, for her microbiology and biochemistry project. She attends the San Diego Jewish Academy, San Diego, California. || 
|-id=700
| 33700 Gluckman ||  || Leia Ruth Gluckman (born 2004) is a finalist in the 2017 Broadcom MASTERS, a math and science competition for middle school students, for her materials & bioengineering project. She attends the Beverly Vista Middle School, Beverly Hills, California. || 
|}

33701–33800 

|-
| 33701 Gotthold ||  || Zoe Anne Gotthold (born 2002) is a finalist in the 2017 Broadcom MASTERS, a math and science competition for middle school students, for her environmental and earth sciences project. She attends the Carmichael Middle School, Richland, Washington. || 
|-id=702
| 33702 Spencergreen ||  || Spencer S. Green (born 2004) is a finalist in the 2017 Broadcom MASTERS, a math and science competition for middle school students, for his electrical and mechanical engineering project. He attends the Pegasus School, Huntington Beach, California. || 
|-id=703
| 33703 Anthonyhill ||  || Anthony Glenn Hill (born 2002) is a finalist in the 2017 Broadcom MASTERS, a math and science competition for middle school students, for his plant science project. He attends the Churchill Junior High, Salt Lake City, Utah. || 
|-id=704
| 33704 Herinkang ||  || Herin Kang (born 2004) is a finalist in the 2017 Broadcom MASTERS, a math and science competition for middle school students, for her environmental and earth sciences project. She attends the Stratford Middle School, San Jose, California. || 
|-id=713
| 33713 Mithravamshi ||  || Mithra Vamshi Karamchedu (born 2003) is a finalist in the 2017 Broadcom MASTERS, a math and science competition for middle school students, for his environmental and earth sciences project. He attends the Stoller Middle School, Portland, Oregon. || 
|-id=714
| 33714 Sarakaufman ||  || Sara Lillian Kaufman (born 2005) is a finalist in the 2017 Broadcom MASTERS, a math and science competition for middle school students, for her electrical and mechanical engineering project. She attends the American Heritage School, Plantation, Florida. || 
|-id=725
| 33725 Robertkent ||  || Robert Allen Kent (born 2002) is a finalist in the 2017 Broadcom MASTERS, a math and science competition for middle school students, for his environmental and earth sciences project. He attends the Saint Anselm School, Chesterland, Ohio. || 
|-id=727
| 33727 Kummel ||  || Kathryn Tsi-Pak Kummel (born 2003) is a finalist in the 2017 Broadcom MASTERS, a math and science competition for middle school students, for her environmental and earth sciences project. She attends the North Middle School, Colorado Springs, Colorado. || 
|-id=734
| 33734 Stephenlitt ||  || Stephen Robert Litt (born 2004) is a finalist in the 2017 Broadcom MASTERS, a math and science competition for middle school students, for his medicine and health sciences project. He attends the Lovinggood Middle School, Powder Springs, Georgia. || 
|-id=737
| 33737 Helenlyons ||  || Helen L. Lyons (born 2003) is a finalist in the 2017 Broadcom MASTERS, a math and science competition for middle school students, for her electrical and mechanical engineering project. She attends the Hunter College High School, New York, New York. || 
|-id=740
| 33740 Arjunmoorthy ||  || Arjun Moorthy (born 2002) is a finalist in the 2017 Broadcom MASTERS, a math and science competition for middle school students, for his behavioral and social sciences project. He attends the BASIS Scottsdale, Scottsdale, Arizona. || 
|-id=746
| 33746 Sombart || 1999 OK || Jean-Pierre Sombart, a French amateur astronomer who constructed the 0.4-m Newtonian-Cassegrain telescope at the Pises Observatory  and also took an active part in using it to observe minor planets || 
|-id=747
| 33747 Clingan ||  || Roy Clingan (born 1950), an American amateur astronomer and discoverer of minor planets || 
|-id=750
| 33750 Davehiggins ||  || David J. Higgins (born 1961), Australian business analyst and amateur astronomer, operator of Hunters Hill Observatory and a discoverer of minor planets || 
|-id=761
| 33761 Honoranavid ||  || Honora Ellen Navid (born 2003) is a finalist in the 2017 Broadcom MASTERS, a math and science competition for middle school students, for her environmental and earth sciences project. She attends the Shady Side Academy Middle School, Pittsburgh, Pennsylvania. || 
|-id=762
| 33762 Sanjayseshan ||  || Sanjay Seshan (born 2002) is a finalist in the 2017 Broadcom MASTERS, a math and science competition for middle school students, for his electrical and mechanical engineering project. He attends the Dorseyville Middle School, Pittsburgh, Pennsylvania. || 
|-id=789
| 33789 Sharmacam ||  || Cameron Sharma (born 2004) is a finalist in the 2017 Broadcom MASTERS, a math and science competition for middle school students, for his medicine and health sciences project. He attends the George H. Moody Middle School, Richmond, Virginia. || 
|-id=799
| 33799 Myra ||  || Myra J. Halpin, American finalist in both NASA's Teacher in Space (1985) and Educator Astronaut Teacher (2004) competitions || 
|-id=800
| 33800 Gross ||  || John Gross (born 1959), American amateur astronomer || 
|}

33801–33900 

|-
| 33801 Emilyshi ||  || Emily Tian Shi (born 2003) is a finalist in the 2017 Broadcom MASTERS, a math and science competition for middle school students, for her plant science project. She attends the Cambridge School, San Diego, California. || 
|-id=806
| 33806 Shrivastava ||  || Aryansh Shrivastava (born 2004) is a finalist in the 2017 Broadcom MASTERS, a math and science competition for middle school students, for his computer science and software engineering project. He attends the Washington High School, Fremont, California. || 
|-id=810
| 33810 Tangirala ||  || Pujita Srilalitha Tangirala (born 2004) is a finalist in the 2017 Broadcom MASTERS, a math and science competition for middle school students, for her chemistry project. She attends the Challenger School, Strawberry Park, San Jose, California. || 
|-id=811
| 33811 Scottobin ||  || Scott Russell Tobin (born 2003) is a finalist in the 2017 Broadcom MASTERS, a math and science competition for middle school students, for his environmental and earth sciences project. He attends the Creekside Middle School, Port Orange, Florida. || 
|-id=814
| 33814 Viswesh ||  || Annika Viswesh (born 2003) is a finalist in the 2017 Broadcom MASTERS, a math and science competition for middle school students, for her computer science and software engineering project. She attends the Stratford Sunnyvale Raynor Middle School, Sunnyvale, California. || 
|-id=817
| 33817 Fariswald ||  || Faris Irwin Wald (born 2002) is a finalist in the 2017 Broadcom MASTERS, a math and science competition for middle school students, for his environmental and earth sciences project. He attends the Capshaw Middle School, Santa Fe, New Mexico. || 
|-id=823
| 33823 Mariorigutti ||  || Mario Rigutti (born 1926) is an accomplished astronomer. He worked at the Arcetri Observatory, was president of the IAS, was chairman of the Solar Eclipses Working Group of the International Astronomical Union and was director of the Capodimonte Astronomical Observatory in Naples. || 
|-id=825
| 33825 Reganwill ||  || Regan Catherine Williams (born 2005) is a finalist in the 2017 Broadcom MASTERS, a math and science competition for middle school students, for her animal science project. She attends the Roland-Grise Middle School, Wilmington, North Carolina. || 
|-id=826
| 33826 Kevynadams ||  || Kevyn Adams mentored a finalist in the 2017 Broadcom MASTERS, a math and science competition for middle school students. He teaches at the BASIS Independent Silicon Valley, San Jose, California. || 
|-id=829
| 33829 Asherson ||  || Caryn Asherson mentored a finalist in the 2017 Broadcom MASTERS, a math and science competition for middle school students. She teaches at the Beverly Vista Middle School, Beverly Hills, California. || 
|-id=834
| 33834 Hannahkaplan ||  || Hannah Kaplan (born 1991) is a postdoctoral researcher at the Southwest Research Institute (Boulder, CO) working on the OSIRIS-REx mission. She specializes in using remote sensing techniques and spectroscopy for research in Earth and Planetary Sciences. || 
|-id=838
| 33838 Brandabaker ||  || Branda Baker mentored a finalist in the 2017 Broadcom MASTERS, a math and science competition for middle school students. She teaches at the Carmichael Middle School, Richland, Washington. || 
|-id=852
| 33852 Baschnagel ||  || Amy Baschnagel mentored a finalist in the 2017 Broadcom MASTERS, a math and science competition for middle school students. She teaches at the Marshall Middle School, Wexford, Pennsylvania. || 
|-id=861
| 33861 Boucvalt ||  || Cathy Boucvalt mentored a finalist in the 2017 Broadcom MASTERS, a math and science competition for middle school students. She teaches at the John Curtis Christian School, River Ridge, Louisiana. || 
|-id=863
| 33863 Elfriederwin ||  || Elfriede and Erwin Schwab Sr., parents of German astronomer Erwin Schwab, member of the group that discovered this body ‡ || 
|-id=869
| 33869 Brunnermatt ||  || Matt Brunner mentored a finalist in the 2017 Broadcom MASTERS, a math and science competition for middle school students. He teaches at the Shady Side Academy Middle School, Pittsburgh, Pennsylvania. || 
|-id=871
| 33871 Locastillo ||  || Lourdie Castillo mentored a finalist in the 2017 Broadcom MASTERS, a math and science competition for middle school students. He teaches at the Hunter College High School, New York, New York. || 
|-id=872
| 33872 Kristichung ||  || Kristi Chung mentored a finalist in the 2017 Broadcom MASTERS, a math and science competition for middle school students. She teaches at the Stratford Middle School, San Jose, California. || 
|-id=875
| 33875 Laurencooney ||  || Lauren Cooney mentored a finalist in the 2017 Broadcom MASTERS, a math and science competition for middle school students. She teaches at the BASIS Scottsdale, Scottsdale, Arizona. || 
|-id=879
| 33879 Kierstendeen ||  || Kiersten Deen mentored a finalist in the 2017 Broadcom MASTERS, a math and science competition for middle school students. She teaches at the North Middle School, Colorado Springs, Colorado. || 
|-id=886
| 33886 Lilydeveau ||  || Lily Deveau mentored a finalist in the 2017 Broadcom MASTERS, a math and science competition for middle school students. She teaches at the San Diego Jewish Academy, San Diego, California. || 
|-id=889
| 33889 Jengebo ||  || Jen Gebo mentored a finalist in the 2017 Broadcom MASTERS, a math and science competition for middle school students. She teaches at the Missoula International School, Missoula, Montana. || 
|-id=892
| 33892 Meligingrich ||  || Melissa Gingrich mentored a finalist in the 2017 Broadcom MASTERS, a math and science competition for middle school students. She teaches at the Cambridge School, San Diego, California. || 
|-id=896
| 33896 Hickson ||  || Dylan Hickson (born 1991) is a postdoctoral scholar at the Arecibo Observatory, Puerto Rico, who specializes in radar observations of near-Earth asteroids and understanding the properties of planetary surfaces and regolith using radar scattering measurements. || 
|-id=897
| 33897 Erikagreen ||  || Erika Green mentored a finalist in the 2017 Broadcom MASTERS, a math and science competition for middle school students. She teaches at the Burlington Township Middle School, Burlington, New Jersey. || 
|-id=898
| 33898 Kendra ||  || Kendra Harrison mentored a finalist in the 2017 Broadcom MASTERS, a math and science competition for middle school students. She teaches at the Roland-Grise Middle School, Wilmington, North Carolina. || 
|}

33901–34000 

|-id=902
| 33902 Ingoldsby ||  || Martin Ingoldsby mentored a finalist in the 2017 Broadcom MASTERS, a math and science competition for middle school students. He teaches at the Creekside Middle School, Port Orange, Florida. || 
|-id=904
| 33904 Janardhanan ||  || Vidya Janardhanan mentored a finalist in the 2017 Broadcom MASTERS, a math and science competition for middle school students. She teaches at the Stratford Sunnyvale Raynor Middle School, Sunnyvale, California. || 
|-id=905
| 33905 Leyajoykutty ||  || Leya Joykutty mentored a finalist in the 2017 Broadcom MASTERS, a math and science competition for middle school students. She teaches at the American Heritage School, Plantation, Florida. || 
|-id=907
| 33907 Christykrenek ||  || Christy Krenek mentored a finalist in the 2017 Broadcom MASTERS, a math and science competition for middle school students. She teaches at the Capshaw Middle School, Santa Fe, New Mexico. || 
|-id=910
| 33910 Lestarge ||  || Brian LeStarge mentored a finalist in the 2017 Broadcom MASTERS, a math and science competition for middle school students. He teaches at the Churchill Junior High, Salt Lake City, Utah. || 
|-id=912
| 33912 Melissanoland ||  || Melissa Noland mentored a finalist in the 2017 Broadcom MASTERS, a math and science competition for middle school students. She teaches at the Krystal School of Science, Math, and Technology, Hesperia, California. || 
|-id=917
| 33917 Kellyoconnor ||  || Kelly O'Connor mentored a finalist in the 2017 Broadcom MASTERS, a math and science competition for middle school students. She teaches at the George H. Moody Middle School, Richmond, Virginia. || 
|-id=918
| 33918 Janiscoville ||  || Janice Scoville mentored a finalist in the 2017 Broadcom MASTERS, a math and science competition for middle school students. She teaches at the Lovinggood Middle School, Powder Springs, Georgia. || 
|-id=920
| 33920 Trivisonno ||  || Andrea Trivisonno mentored a finalist in the 2017 Broadcom MASTERS, a math and science competition for middle school students. She teaches at the Saint Anselm School, Chesterland, Ohio. || 
|-id=923
| 33923 Juliewarren ||  || Julie Warren mentored a finalist in the 2017 Broadcom MASTERS, a math and science competition for middle school students. She teaches at the Pegasus School, Huntington Beach, California. || 
|-id=929
| 33929 Lisaprato ||  || Lisa A. Prato, assistant astronomer at Lowell Observatory || 
|-id=932
| 33932 Keane ||  || Jacqueline V. Keane (born 1973) is an Assistant Astronomer at the Institute for Astronomy, University of Hawaii whose research interests include the use of ground- and space-based facilities to study the comae and nuclei of comets. || 
|-id=936
| 33936 Johnwells ||  || John Wells mentored a finalist in the 2017 Broadcom MASTERS, a math and science competition for middle school students. He teaches at the William Hopkins Junior High School, Fremont, California. || 
|-id=937
| 33937 Raphaelmarschall ||  || Raphael Marschall (born 1987) is a Research Scholar at the Southwest Research Institute whose studies include modeling the gas and dust emission from cometary nuclei and interpretation of a complementary set of observations of comet Churyumov-Gerasimenko acquired by the Rosetta mission. || 
|-id=958
| 33958 Zaferiou ||  || Paraskevy Zaferiou mentored a finalist in the 2017 Broadcom MASTERS, a math and science competition for middle school students. She teaches at the Garden City Middle School, Garden City, New York. || 
|-id=961
| 33961 Macinleyneve ||  || Macinley Neve Butson (born 2000) was awarded first place in the 2017 Intel International Science and Engineering Fair for her translational medical science project. She attends the Illawarra Grammar School, Mangerton, NSW, Australia. || 
|-id=963
| 33963 Moranhidalgo ||  || Camila Moran-Hidalgo (born 2002) was awarded second place in the 2017 Intel International Science and Engineering Fair for her biomedical engineering project. She attends the Westdale Secondary School, Hamilton, Ontario, Canada. || 
|-id=979
| 33979 Sunhaochun ||  || Sun Haochun Michael (born 2000) was awarded second place in the 2017 Intel International Science and Engineering Fair for his math team project. He attends the Shanghai American School Puxi, Shanghai, China. || 
|-id=991
| 33991 Weixunjing ||  || Wei Xunjing (born 1999) was awarded first place in the 2017 Intel International Science and Engineering Fair for her physics and astronomy project. She attends the Shanghai High School, Shanghai, China. || 
|-id=994
| 33994 Regidufour ||  || Reginald Dufour, professor in Rice University, Houston || 
|-id=000
| 34000 Martinmatl ||  || Martin Matl (born 1999) was awarded second place in the 2017 Intel International Science and Engineering Fair for his plant sciences project. He attends the Gymnazium Brno, Trida Kapitana Jarose, Brno, Czech Republic. || 
|}

References 

033001-034000